= Napred =

Newspaper

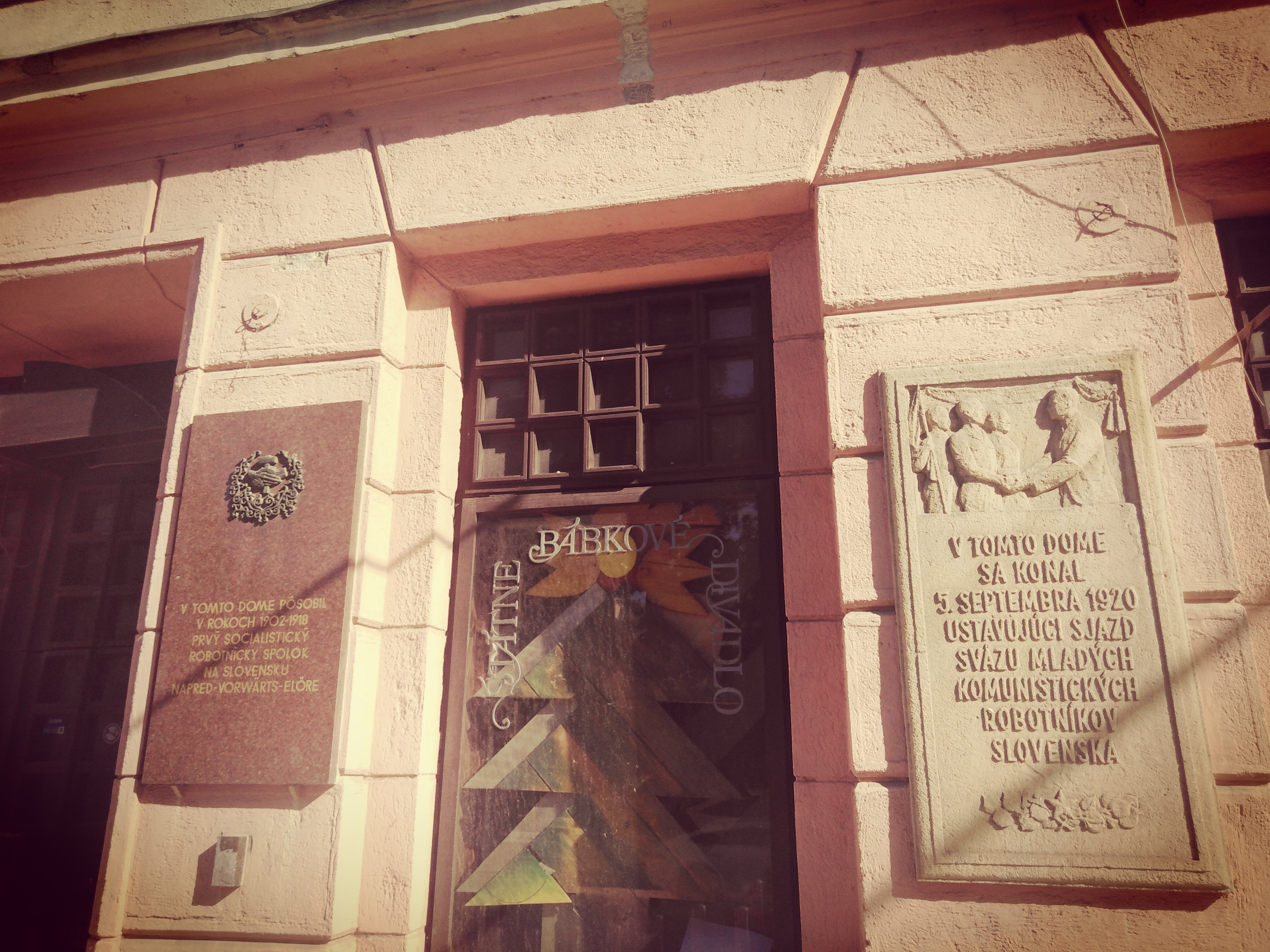
Old puppet theater and memorial plaques of the first socialist association Napred (1902 - 1918) and the founding congress of the Union of Young Communist Workers of Slovakia (1920) in Dunajská street, Bratislava

The Workers Educational Society Napred was a socialist organization founded in Slovakia in February 1869. It was under the direct influence of a similar organization in Vienna. Napred represented the first emergence of the socialist movement in Slovakia.
